Percy is a 1777 tragedy by the British writer Hannah More. It was inspired by the French play Gabrielle de Vergy by Pierre-Laurent Buirette de Belloy.

The play premiered at the Covent Garden Theatre in London. The original cast included William Thomas Lewis as Percy, Francis Aickin as Earl Raby, Thomas Hull as Sir Hubert, John Whitfield as Edric, James Thompson as Servant, Richard Wroughton as Earl Douglas and Ann Street Barry as Elwina. David Garrick wrote both the prologue and epilogue.

References

Bibliography
 Nicoll, Allardyce. A History of English Drama 1660–1900: Volume III. Cambridge University Press, 2009.
 Hogan, C.B (ed.) The London Stage, 1660–1800: Volume V. Southern Illinois University Press, 1968.

1777 plays
British plays
Tragedy plays
West End plays